Claudio Del Vecchio (born 1956) is an Italian businessman and was the chairman, CEO, and owner of Brooks Brothers Group, Inc., the holding company of Brooks Brothers.

His father Leonardo Del Vecchio was the billionaire founder of Luxottica, an Italian eyewear company, and Claudio has been called his "heir apparent".

References

Living people
Italian businesspeople
1956 births
Claudio